Walter Voß (26 April 1885 in Neuschloß, Lampertheim – 5 June 1972 in Marburg) was a German jurist and politician. He was the mayor of Marburg from 1928–1945, from 16 January 1942 until 6 April 1945 he was temporary the Lord mayor of Marburg. He was buried in Braunschweig.

References 

1885 births
1972 deaths
Mayors of Marburg
Jurists from Hesse